The list of ship decommissionings in 2020 includes a chronological list of ships decommissioned in 2020.

References

2020
 
Ships